The 1951 UCLA Bruins football team represented the University of California, Los Angeles (UCLA) as a member of the Pacific Coast Conference (PCC) during the 1951 college football season. Led by third-year head coach Red Sanders, the Bruins compiled a record of 5–3–1 with a mark of 4–1–1 in conference play, placing second in the PCC.

Schedule

Game summaries

USC
For the first time, the Bruins defeated the Trojans in consecutive seasons. UCLA won the previous season's game 39–0. Scoring for the Bruins were Don Stalwick, Ike Jones, and Donn Moomaw. Late in the fourth quarter, Jim Sears scored for USC to avoid another shutout.

References

UCLA
UCLA Bruins football seasons
UCLA Bruins football
UCLA Bruins football